Events from the year 1306 in Ireland.

Incumbent
Lord: Edward I

Events
Thomas Cantock, Bishop of Emly became Lord Chancellor of Ireland

Deaths